Sara Keane (born June 7, 1991) is an American soccer player who last played as goalkeeper for FC Kansas City.

Keane grew up in Mount Laurel, New Jersey and played high school soccer at Bishop Eustace Preparatory School.

She is currently a high-ranking account manager at Ewing Sports.

Honours 
FC Kansas City
Winner
 National Women's Soccer League: 2014

References

External links 
 
 Profile at soccerdonna.de 

1991 births
Living people
National Women's Soccer League players
FC Kansas City players
American women's soccer players
Bishop Eustace Preparatory School alumni
People from Mount Laurel, New Jersey
Soccer players from New Jersey
Sportspeople from Burlington County, New Jersey
West Virginia Mountaineers women's soccer players
Women's association football goalkeepers